Zhanjilepis aspartilis is an extinct yunnanolepid placoderm from Pridoli and Lochkovian rocks of Hunan, China. Zhanjilepis is known only from distinctively ordered plates.

Description

Plates
Zhanjilepis plates are very similar to the Late Llandovery yunnanolepid Shimenolepis, also known from distinctively ornamented plates.

References

Placoderms of Asia